Greenspan is a typically Ashkenazi Jewish surname. It is the anglicized form of the German/Yiddish surname Grünspan ("green swarf", "green patina", "verdigris", "copper(II) acetate"). Cognate are the surnames Grynszpan, Grinszpan and Grinshpan (Poland, Romania, Hungary).

Notable people with the surname include:

 Alan Greenspan (born 1926), American economist, former Federal Reserve Chairman
 Alison Greenspan (1972–2021), American film and television producer 
 Bennett Greenspan (born 1952), American entrepreneur, founder of Family Tree DNA
 Brad Greenspan (born 20th century), American entrepreneur (MySpace)
 Brian Greenspan (born 1947), Canadian lawyer
 Bud Greenspan (1926–2010), American film director
 David Greenspan (born 1956), American actor and playwright
 Dorie Greenspan (born 20th century), American author of cookbooks
 Edward Greenspon (born 1957), Canadian newspaper editor
 Harvey P. Greenspan (born 1933), American mathematician
 Herschel Grynszpan (1921-before 1945), Jewish assassin
 Jason Scott Greenspan (born 1959), aka Jason Alexander, American actor
 Jerry Greenspan (born 1941), American basketball player
 Marshall Greenspan, American engineer
 Mauro Cabral Grinspan, (born  1971), Argentinian intersex and trans activist
 Melissa Greenspan (born 20th century), American actress
 Nachman Shlomo Greenspan (1878–1961), Polish-born UK rabbi and Talmudic scholar
 Natan Grinszpan-Kikiel, birth name of Roman Romkowski, state security official in Communist Poland
 Ryan Greenspan (born 1982), American paintball player
 Stanley Greenspan (born 1941), American psychiatrist

See also 
 Greenspoon
 Greenspun

German-language surnames
Jewish surnames
Yiddish-language surnames